The 2012 Lamar Cardinals football team represented Lamar University in the 2012 NCAA Division I FCS football season. The Cardinals were led by third-year head coach Ray Woodard and played their home games at Provost Umphrey Stadium. They were a member of the Southland Conference. They finished the season 4–8, 1–6 in Southland play to finish in seventh place.

Media
All Cardinals football games will be broadcast on KLVI AM 560 as part of the Lamar Cardinals Radio Network. At least 3 games, including 2 road games, will be broadcast on Fox 4 KBTV as the Cardinals complete the third year of a five-year deal granting exclusive broadcast rights to select Cardinals games to KBTV. SLC TV could cover 1 or 2 games minimum in addition to the KBTV games. Cardinals SLC TV games will air locally on KUIL-LD.

Before the season

2012 recruits
Lamar signed 21 players on national letter of intent day. Four additional college recruits signed on previously, in December 2011, to bring the recruiting class to 25-members strong. On May 11, Lamar gained another player from Tyler Jr. College to bring the squad up to 26 new members. In June Lamar gained 4 transfers, 2 from Oklahoma State and 2 from various junior colleges. Because 3 of the 4 redshirted last season and the fourth was a JC transfer, all 4 will be eligible to play in the 2012 season. It brings the Lamar recruiting class up t 30 for 2012. Recruits are listed here. Player profiles for each recruit are available at the signing day link below.

2nd Crawfish Bowl
The 2nd Annual Red-White Crayfish Bowl was held Saturday, May 17 at 7 PM. The team was divided into a red and white team, and 4 12-minute quarters were played.

Sources: 

The Crawfish Bowl would need overtime to decide the winner. Both the red and white teams struggled to move the ball in different ways. The Red team only netted 6 yards rushing on 18 attempts. The white team pounded out 58-yards rushing with just one person, the returning medical redshirted DePauldrick Garrett. On the other hand, the white team owned the skies as they outgained the red team 155 to 79. Due to an imbalance in the number of quarterbacks, Caleb Berry would play for both teams. He would leave the game as the leading passer going 15-for-25 for 138 yards. Counterpart Jeremy Johnson would go 7-for-17 for 55 yards, but he also had 1 interception. Mossakowski had the fewest passing yards, with only 41 yards passing, but he also had the only touchdown.

The Red team had a chance to even the game up, but Mike Venson fumbled the ball on second down to secure the win for the white squad.

Defense dominated the game on both sides of the ball. Joe Viator, of the white team, led all players with 8 tackles. James Washington had five tackles and one sack for the white team, and Marcus Malbrough wasn't far behind with 4 tackles, 1 sack, 1.5 tackles for loss, and a quarterback hurry.

For the red squad Adren Dorsey led the team with two sacks. Keinon Peterson had six tackles, and Eric Arnold and Mark Murrill each had a sack.

There was only one scoring opportunity prior to the fourth quarter. Berry completed a pair of passes to Payton Ploch and one to Kyle hildreth to move the ball to the white teams 23-yard line. After the drive stalled Juventino Sanchez would try a 43-yard field goal which ended short. The red-team again drove deep into white territory on the final drive of regulation, but Sanchez missed a 42-yard field goal to end regulation.

Perhaps the highlight of the night came from Punter Kolin Kahler played for both teams and was on the field 13 times. He averaged 42.4 yards per punt for the white team and 40-yards per punt for the red-team. His longest punt came in at 56 yards, and 3 of the punts forced the opposing team to start inside the 20.

Roster

Schedule

Game summaries

Louisiana-Lafayette
 
The Cardinals will open the season with an older rival in Louisiana as they meet the Ragin' Cajuns. The Rajin' Cajuns have dominated the series against the Cardinals 21-12 and are on a current 3 game winning streak against the Cardinals. The two schools compete for the Sabine Shoe trophy.

Sources:

Prairie View A&M

The Cardinals open up their home slate with their first ever contest against fellow Texas University Prairie View A&M.

Sources:

Hawaii

The Cardinals return to FBS country for their first ever contest against the Warriors.

Sources:

Langston

The final tuneup before conference play will feature the first ever meeting between the Langston Lions and Lamar.

Sources:

Southeastern Louisiana

The Cardinals open conference play against the Lions. The Cardinals currently own a 3-1 advantage in the series 

Sources:

Northwestern State

Despite a 5-3 advantage in the overall series, the Cardinals will be seeking to prove they can compete with the Demons in this 2012 contest. The Demons won the revival game of this series in 2011 and have won 3 of the last 4.

Sources:

McMurry

The Cardinals return home for homecoming on October 20. It will be the final non-conference tilt of the year (not counting the playoffs) and they will celebrate homecoming in this contest against the War Hawks, who are celebrating their first year in the Division 2 level. It will be the third meeting between the Cardinals and War Hawks, with the previous two having come in 1953 and 1954. Currently the series is split 1-1.

Sources:

Central Arkansas

The Cardinals head to Conway, Arkansas for the second match against their SLC rival, the Bears. Currently Central Arkansas leads the series 1-0.

Sources:

Sam Houston State

The 19th meeting between the Cardinals and the Bearkats gives Sam Houston State back-to-back games in the state of Texas. The Bearkats own a 10-7-1 series advantage with most of the success having occurred in recent years, having won 7 of the last 8 meetings.

Sources:

Stephen F. Austin

The Lumberjacks have won four consecutive against the Cardinals and five of the last six meetings, but overall the Cardinals lead the series 18-10-2.

Sources:

Nicholls State

The Cardinals and the Colonels go head-to-head in their 5th contest for the Cardinals final home game of the season. Currently the Cardinals lead the Colonels 3-1.

Sources:

McNeese State

This Cardinals end the 2012 regular season by returning to Lake Charles to face the Cowboys. Overall this will be the 27th meeting between the two schools. The Cowboys lead the overall series 18-7-1, and the Cowboys have won 8 of the last 9 matches.

Sources:

References

Lamar
Lamar Cardinals football seasons
Lamar Cardinals football